Brooke Bolander is an American author of speculative fiction.

Biography
Bolander attended the University of Leicester, studying History and Archaeology, and is a graduate of the 2011 Clarion Workshop.

Literary career
Bolander's work, including both short fiction and essays, has been published in venues such as Lightspeed, Uncanny Magazine, and Strange Horizons. Her novelette, "And You Shall Know Her by the Trail of Dead" was a finalist for the 2016 Hugo Award for Best Novelette, the 2015 Nebula Award for Best Novelette, and the 2016 Locus Award for Best Novelette, and was included in The Year's Best Science Fiction & Fantasy: 2016. Her short story "Our Talons Can Crush Galaxies" was a finalist for the 2016 Nebula Award for Best Short Story and the Hugo Award for Best Short Story. Her novelette, "The Only Harmless Great Thing"  won the 2018 Nebula Award for Best Novelette and the 2019 Locus Award for Best Novelette, and was a finalist for the 2019 Hugo Award for Best Novelette.

Bibliography

Fiction
"Trickster Blues" (2008)
"Her Words Like Hunting Vixens Spring" (2012)
"Tornado's Siren" (2012)
"Sun Dogs" (2012)
"The Beasts of the Earth, the Madness of Men" (2013)
"Darlings" (2014)
"The Legend of RoboNinja" (2014) [only as by RoboNinja]
"Mechanical Animals" (2014)
"And You Shall Know Her by the Trail of Dead" (2015)
"Our Talons Can Crush Galaxies" (2016)
"The Last of the Minotaur Wives" (2017)
The Only Harmless Great Thing (2018)
"The Tale of the Three Beautiful Raptor Sisters, and the Prince Who Was Made of Meat" (2018)
"No Flight Without the Shatter" (2018)

Nonfiction
"Breaching the Gap" (2014)
"Introduction" (Genius Loci) (2016)
"The Uncanny Dinosaurs—Introduction" (2018)

Awards and nominations
"And You Shall Know Her by the Trail of Dead" was a finalist for the 2016 Hugo Award for Best Novelette, the 2015 Nebula Award for Best Novelette, the 2016 Locus Award for Best Novelette, and the 2016 Theodore Sturgeon Memorial Award.

"Our Talons Can Crush Galaxies" was a finalist for the 2016 Nebula Award for Best Short Story and the Hugo Award for Best Short Story. It was also nominated for a World Fantasy Award in 2017 for Best Short Fiction.

The Only Harmless Great Thing  won the 2018 Nebula Award for Best Novelette and the 2019 Locus Award for Best Novelette, and is a finalist for the 2019 Hugo Award for Best Novelette, the 2019 World Fantasy Award for Best Novella, the Shirley Jackson Award, and the Theodore Sturgeon Memorial Award.

"The Tale of the Three Beautiful Raptor Sisters, and the Prince Who Was Made of Meat"  was a finalist for the 2019 Hugo Award for Best Short Story.

References

External links 
 
 Brooke Bolander at the Internet Speculative Fiction Database
 

Living people
Articles created or improved during ArtAndFeminism 2017
Nebula Award winners
21st-century American women writers
American speculative fiction writers
Year of birth missing (living people)
Place of birth missing (living people)
Alumni of the University of Leicester